Caio Garcia Suguino (born 3 November 1987 in Brazil) is a Brazilian footballer.

References

Brazilian footballers
Living people
1987 births
Association football midfielders
FC Milsami Orhei players
Tarxien Rainbows F.C. players
Qormi F.C. players
Gżira United F.C. players
Cerro Largo F.C. players